Colton Hills Community School is a mixed secondary school and sixth form situated in the Goldthorn Park area of Wolverhampton, West Midlands, England.

Admissions
The school has over 950 pupils on its roll, including sixth formers. It is situated halfway between Goldthorn Park and Colton Hills. Park Hill is to the east, and the school is close to the LEA boundary with Dudley (Sedgley). Access is via the A4039, to the north, and is not far from the A449, to the west.

History

Grammar school
Wolverhampton Municipal Grammar School was on Newhampton Road East, run by Wolverhampton Education Committee, and was co-educational, when Wolverhampton was in Staffordshire. The building is now the Newhampton Centre of City of Wolverhampton College. It was known as the Higher Grade School from 1894 to 1921, and Wolverhampton Municipal Secondary School from 1921 to 1945. From 1977, the building was used by Valley Park School until 1989.

The school was commonly known as the 'Muni', and its motto was Post Tenebras Lux, which means 'Out of Darkness Comes Light', which is also the motto of the City of Wolverhampton itself.

Colton Hills Community School currently houses 1,009 students.

Comprehensive
Graiseley Secondary School was a coeducational secondary modern school, formed in 1963. It is now Graiseley Primary School on Graiseley Hill. There had been a Graiseley Boys' Secondary School and a Graiseley Girls' Secondary School. Penn Secondary School was on Manor Road in Penn.

Colton Hills School was formed in September 1974 from a merger of Graiseley and Penn secondary modern schools in the Graiseley district of Wolverhampton and of Wolverhampton Municipal Grammar School in Whitmore Reans. It initially existed within the buildings of these two schools before relocating to the site at Goldthorn Park during 1975, on land which Wolverhampton had gained from Sedgley in the local government reorganisation of 1966.

It was initially known as Colton Hills Upper School, with the Newhampton Road site briefly used. The Lower School, comprising the first two years of secondary, was at the Manor Road site until 1992-3 when these years moved to the main site. The Manor Road site was later demolished and replaced by Penn Medical Centre and housing.

It has had specialist languages designation since 2006 and been a Creative Partnership school since 2008. Its student population is ethnically diverse, with the highest proportion having an Indian heritage.

Facilities
The school's facilities include a swimming pool which is also open to public use. It also has a field, an AstroTurf, theatre, sports hall and dance studio.

Notable former pupils
 Kevin Darley, jockey
 Delicious Orie, boxer, winner of gold medal at Commonwealth Games 2022

Wolverhampton Municipal Grammar School
 Frances Barber, actress
 Howard R. Davies, motorcycle racing champion
 Jon Raven, musician

See also
 Wolverhampton Grammar School, co-educational independent school

References

External links
 Colton Hills Community School official website
 EduBase
 WMGS
 History of WMGS
 WMGS history
 Roll of Honour of WMSS
 1959 former school prospectus
 Graiseley Secondary School archives

Secondary schools in Wolverhampton
Educational institutions established in 1974
1974 establishments in England
Community schools in Wolverhampton
Higher grade schools
Specialist language colleges in England